The 2018 Military Bowl was a college football bowl game that was played on December 31, 2018. It was the 11th edition of the Military Bowl, and was one of the 2018–19 bowl games concluding the 2018 FBS football season. Sponsored by defense contractor Northrop Grumman, the game was officially known as the Military Bowl presented by Northrop Grumman.

Teams
The game was played between Virginia Tech of the Atlantic Coast Conference (ACC) and Cincinnati of the American Athletic Conference (The American). The two programs had previously met 11 times, with Virginia Tech holding a 6–5 lead in the series. It was their second meeting in the Military Bowl, having previously contested the 2014 edition, with Virginia Tech winning 33–17.

Virginia Tech Hokies

Virginia Tech received and accepted a bid to the Military Bowl on December 2. The Hokies entered the bowl with a 6–6 record (4–4 in conference). After starting the season 4–2, the Hokies lost four games in a row, then finished with two wins, giving them the six wins needed for bowl eligibility. This was Virginia Tech's 26th consecutive bowl appearance, having played in a bowl every season since the 1993 Independence Bowl.

Cincinnati Bearcats

Cincinnati received and accepted a bid to the Military Bowl on December 2. The Bearcats entered the bowl with a 10–2 record (6–2 in conference).

Game summary

Scoring summary

Statistics

References

External links

Media guide
Box score at ESPN

Military Bowl
Military Bowl
Military Bowl
Military Bowl
Cincinnati Bearcats football bowl games
Virginia Tech Hokies football bowl games